HMS Devastation was the first of two Devastation-class mastless turret ships built for the Royal Navy. This was the first class of ocean-going capital ship that did not carry sails, and the first whose entire main armament was mounted on top of the hull rather than inside it.

Design and construction

Devastation was built at a time in which steam power was well-established among the world's larger naval powers. However, most ships built at this time were equipped not only with a steam engine, but also with masts and sails for auxiliary power. The presence of masts also prohibited the use of gun turrets since the rigging would obstruct their arc of fire. Devastation, designed by Sir Edward J. Reed, represented a change from this pattern when she was built without masts and her primary armament, two turrets each with two 12-inch (305 mm) muzzle-loading guns, was placed on the top of the hull, allowing each turret a 280-degree arc of fire.

Devastation was the first turret ship built to an Admiralty design. The ship had a double bottom, and was divided internally into watertight compartments. She also carried 30 tons of water, enough for three weeks, and 19 tons of provisions, six weeks supply for her crew of 329.

Following the loss of the masted turret ship , which capsized and sank on 6 September 1870 with the loss of 500 men, almost her entire crew, a special committee was appointed to examine the design of this type of vessel, and particularly the Devastation. Although they found no reason for concern in the stability of the ship, as a safety precaution a number of changes were made to the design. The 25-ton guns were replaced with RML 12 inch 35 ton guns.

Sea trials were made in mid-1873 and generated an unusual amount of public interest; not just for the novelty of her appearance, but as the successor to the Captain. Gunnery trials were made off the Isle of Wight, firing  Palliser shells. Apart from a tendency for her low forecastle to be swept by the sea, she performed slightly better than her companions in both pitch and roll.

Service history
Devastation was deployed to serve in the waters of the United Kingdom and the Mediterranean Sea. In 1891, the 12-inch guns were replaced with 10-inch breech-loading guns and she was refitted with new triple-expansion steam engines.

In November 1898 Captain Frederick Inglefield was appointed as her commander. In March 1900 she is reported to have visited Syracuse, Sicily. In 1901 she was guard ship at the port of Gibraltar, until relieved as such by newly commissioned  in February 1902. She left the Mediterranean station headquarters at Malta, homebound, on 19 February 1902, and after a last visit to Gibraltar arrived in Plymouth on 2 April. She was paid off at Devonport on 18 April, and proceeded to Portsmouth.
On 21 June 1902 she was recommissioned as a tender to the torpedo school ship HMS Vernon. She took part in the fleet review held at Spithead on 16 August 1902 for the coronation of King Edward VII.

Later, she was refitted again and assigned to the First Reserve Fleet based in Scotland. The ship was broken up in 1908.

Popular culture
 HMS Devastation is familiar as the ship depicted on "England's Glory" matchboxes.
 Her badge was also issued by publishers for use in Monogram and Crest Albums – a popular collecting hobby of the second half of the 19th century.

References

 
 
 Ross, David. Great Warships From The Age of Steam. New York: Metro Books, 2014. pp. 22–23

External links
 
 
 HMS Devastation (1871)

 

Devastation-class ironclads
Ships built in Portsmouth
1871 ships
Victorian-era battleships of the United Kingdom